Abdulaziz Hasan Al-Buloushi (born 4 December 1962) is a Kuwaiti football forward who played for Kuwait in the 1982 FIFA World Cup. He also played for Qadsia SC.

References

External links
FIFA profile

1962 births
Kuwaiti footballers
Kuwait international footballers
Kuwaiti people of Iranian descent
Kuwaiti people of Baloch descent
Association football midfielders
1982 FIFA World Cup players
Living people
1984 AFC Asian Cup players
Asian Games medalists in football
Footballers at the 1982 Asian Games
Footballers at the 1986 Asian Games
Asian Games silver medalists for Kuwait
Medalists at the 1982 Asian Games
Qadsia SC players
Kuwait Premier League players